Ned Evett (born May 9, 1967) is an American guitarist, singer and songwriter, best known for inventing and playing the fretless glass-necked guitar.

Biography
Edward Duncan Evett was born in Nashville, Tennessee, United States. A son of a university English professor and an opera singer mother, Evett excelled at music; first playing the ukulele at the age of 11, progressing to the classical guitar and giving his first professional performance at the age of sixteen. He then won a classical guitar scholarship, but dropped out before graduating to play in rock bands around the US.

Evett began playing fretless guitar in 1990 on a modified stratocaster. He first appeared in print in Fingerstyle magazine's 'Bizarre Guitars' profile, who stated "Ned Evett will make you reconsider the plucked-string instrument".

Evett developed the use of glass fingerboards for fretless guitar in 1996. In 1996, Evett played the fretless glass-necked guitar with Warner Brothers Recording artists Built to Spill, on their album, The Normal Years.
 
In 2003, Evett won the North American Rock Guitar Competition and, in 2004, PBS Television broadcast a documentary about the competition titled Driven To Play. The competition launched a series of high-profile opening concert performances for Evett with notable musicians, including Joe Satriani, the Allman Brothers, John Fogerty, George Thorogood, Eric Johnson, Kansas, and Leon Russell.

In December 2003, USA Today described Evett as "The perfectly sane and vastly entertaining master of the fretless glass-neck guitar".

In 2007, Guitar Player described Evett as "The world's first fretless guitar rockstar".

In 2012, Evett released Treehouse, his sixth solo record, produced in Nashville, Tennessee by musician Adrian Belew.

An animated filmmaker, Evett and Joe Satriani co-created the original animated series Crystal Planet, currently in development.

Discography
Built to Spill : The Normal Years (1993)
An Introduction to Fretless Guitar (2001)
Fretless Guitar Masters (2001)
Circus Liquor (2003)
Evett/Vigroux (2004)
iStole (2004)
Village of the Unfretted (2005)
Middle of the Middle (2007)
Afraid For You (2010)
Treehouse (2011)

Television appearances
Driven to Play PBS (2004)

References

External links
 North American Rock Guitar Competition

1967 births
Living people
American blues guitarists
American male guitarists
American rock guitarists
American rock singers
Songwriters from Tennessee
Lead guitarists
Guitarists from Tennessee
20th-century American guitarists
20th-century American male musicians
American male songwriters